Kyzyl-Ata is a village in Ala-Buka District of Jalal-Abad Region of Kyrgyzstan. Its population was 2,794 in 2021.

References
 

Populated places in Jalal-Abad Region